The Ancines Woods ( also known as  The Wolf's Forest) is a 1970 Spanish drama/horror film co-written, produced, and directed by Pedro Olea. It is based on the novel by Carlos Martínez-Barbeito, and is partially based on the life of Manuel Blanco Romasanta and his alleged lycanthropy.

Plot

The film focuses on Benito Freire, a lonely and miserable peddler whose world is dominated by ignorance and superstition. Wandering through various Galicia towns, he regularly suffers from severe attacks of epilepsy. Rumors about him begin to spread throughout the region, rumors that claim that Benito is both a werewolf and possessed by a demonic spirit. As the rumors about him continue to spread, Benito slowly descends into madness.

Cast 
 José Luis López Vázquez as Benito Freire
 Amparo Soler Leal as Pacucha
 Antonio Casas as Abad
 John Steiner as Robert
 Nuria Torray as Avelina
 María Fernanda Ladrón de Guevara as Gabriela
 Alfredo Mayo as Don Nicolás de Valcárcel
 Víctor Israel as Lameiro
 María Vico as Queiruga
 Fernando Sánchez Polack as Vilairo
 Pedro Luis León as Minguiños
 María Arias as Mujer de Nicolás
 Porfiria Sanchíz as Vigaira
 Pilar Vela as Sabina

Production

El Bosque del Lobo is based on Carlos Martínez-Barbeito's 1947 novella El bosque de Ancines. The novella itself was partially based upon the life of Spanish serial killer Manuel Blanco Romasanta, who claimed to have suffered from lycanthropy. Development for the film began in 1969 when producer/director Pedro Olea was searching for his next project after directing his first film Días de viejo color (1968). Dissatisfied with the potential projects he was offered, Olea decided to produce and direct an adaption of Martínez-Barbeito's novella. Actor José Luis López Vázquez was cast to portray the film's main protagonist Benito. López Vázquez, who had previously mainly acted in low-brow comedy films before being cast in the film, would later star in non comedic roles in films such as horror thriller La Cabina (1972).

Censorship
While writing the screenplay for El Bosque del Lobo, writer/director Olea was forced to tone down the novel's more explicit violence and negative portrayal of religion in order to avoid possible censorship, stating in an interview with Nuestro cine that, criticism had to be 'more indirect, subterranean, more through the tone of the films than the concrete situations they reflect'. In spite of this, the film was subject to censorship and was denounced by Spanish critics for its perceived anti-religious message and its denouncement of Spanish society of the time. It also received minor controversy when Admiral Carrero Blanco tried to prohibit the film from being released, after viewing the film in a private screening.

Film historian Román Gubern stated that "while the censors allowed the screening of graphic 'bloodsheds performed by British and Spanish Draculas', El Bosque del Lobo was made more palatable by severely softening the depiction of violence and brutality, therefore neutralizing the critique contained in the novel's 'study of criminal anthropology'".

Release

Theatrical release

El Bosque del Lobo premiered at the Valladolid International Film Festival in April 1970. The film was later screened in the United States at the Chicago International Film Festival on November 1971. It was later released theatrically in Spain on April 22, 1971. It was a critical and commercial success upon its initial release. The film was later screened on August 10, 2012; as a part of a tribute to writer/director Olea organized by the Concello de A Bola and the Vicente Risco Foundation.

Critical response and legacy

Modern reassessment of El bosque del lobo has been mostly positive, with critics now praising López Vázquez's performance and Olea's direction.
In their book Performance and Spanish Film; authors Dean Allbritton, Alejandro Flórez Melero, and Tom Whittaker praised Vázquez's performance, writing, "In dramatically reshaping his usual intonation and diction for the role, López Vázquez's voice becomes snarling and inarticulate. His ramshackle appearance was as much of a radical departure as his vocal performance".

The film was not without its detractors.
Antonio Méndez from AlohaCriticón.com gave the film a negative review, writing, "It could be interesting, but the plot is poor, it lacks strength, it has a love subframe and it sins of a scarce psychological treatment that focuses more on superfluous facts than on the sickly and interior emphasis of its characters."

The critical and commercial success of El bosque del lobo, brought widespread attention to director Olea, who would later go on to direct a series of films which included the 1992 adaption El maestro de esgrima (The Fencing Master) which received and Oscar nomination for Best Foreign Film.

Accolades

References
Bibliography

Notes

External links 
 
 
 

1970 films
1970s horror drama films
1970 horror films
1970s serial killer films
Drama films based on actual events
Horror films based on actual events
Films based on Spanish novels
Films directed by Pedro Olea
Films set in the 19th century
Films shot in Spain
Spanish serial killer films
Spanish horror drama films
1970s Spanish-language films
Spanish werewolf films
1970 drama films
1970s Spanish films